The Gestriklands Fotbollförbund (Gestrikland Football Association) is one of the 24 district organisations of the Swedish Football Association. It administers lower tier football in Gästrikland in Norrland.

Background 

Gestriklands Fotbollförbund, commonly referred to as Gestriklands FF, is the governing body for football in the historical province of Gestrikland. The Association was founded on 28 March 1915 and currently has 46 member clubs.  Based in Gävle, the Association's Chairman is Örjan Ohlström.

Affiliated Members 

The following clubs are affiliated to the Gestriklands FF:

Brynäs IF FK
FF Nordost-Fotboll
Forsbacka IK
Furuviks FF
Gävle GIK FK
Gävle Latino FK
Gefle IF FF
Gestrike-Hammarby IF
Hagaströms SK
Hästbo SK
Hedesunda IF
Hille IF
Hofors AIF
Högbo AIK
IFK Gävle
IK Huge
IK Sätra
IK Sport
Jädraås Allmänna IK
Järbo IF
Korpföreningen Heros
Korsnäs BK
Kungsgårdens SK
Lingbo IF
Norrham Hamrångebygdens IF
Norrsundets IF
Ockelbo IF
Sandvikens AIK FK
Sandvikens IF
Sätra DFK
Sjötulls BK
Skutskärs IF FK
Södra BK
Stensätra IF
Storviks IF
Strömsbro IF
Torsåkers IF
Valbo FF
Åbyggeby FK
Åbyggeby FK / Ockelbo
Åmots IF
Årsunda IF
Åshammars IK
Örta IF
Österfärnebo IF
Överhärde IK

League Competitions 
Gestriklands FF run the following League Competitions:

Men's Football
Division 4  -  one section
Division 5  -  one section
Division 6  -  two sections
Division 7  -  three sections

Women's Football
Division 3  -  one section
Division 4  -  one section

Footnotes

External links 
 Gestriklands FF Official Website 

Gestriklands
Football in Gävleborg County
Sports organizations established in 1915
1915 establishments in Sweden